Jeu des petits chevaux is a French cross and circle game, closely related to ludo. It consists of moving several pawns (called horses) to the home reserved for their color. Each player will receive between 1 and 3 horses in general. The first player to reach the last triangular square wins the game.

Rules 

Two to four players each have one or more horse pawns, and play by rolling a dice in turn. A player must first roll a 6 with the dice to be able to remove a horse from his stable. He must then make it go through all the squares located on the periphery of the board, moving it forward by a number of squares equal to the result of the die. The pawns are advanced clockwise.

There are different special cases. Thus, when a horse arrives on a space occupied by a competitor, it sends it back to its stable (the start). On the other hand, if the player arrives on a square occupied by another horse of his color, he stops his pawn just behind. Finally, a 6 obtained on the dice allows you to replay.

After his pawn has gone around the board, the player must make the exact number on the dice so that he stops in front of his staircase. For example, if the horse pawn is located three squares from the bottom of the stairs, the player must roll a 3 on his dice to take his pawn down the stairs. If the number is too large, he advances his pawn to the bottom square of the stairs, then moves it back by the number of squares corresponding to the difference between the number to be made and the number made; taking the example again: if the player rolls 4 with the dice, he will move the pawn forward three spaces, then move it back one space.

Once a player's pawn is in the square in front of the stairs of his color, he must go up step by step to the center of the game. For this, the player must obtain the exact number entered each time. in the box, and a 6 to get to the cut.

The victory is won by the first player who manages to bring, according to variants, one or more of his horse pawns to the cup.

Each player is free to bring out the number of horses he wants, but he can only move one horse per turn.

Cross and circle games